Nelson Lichtenstein (born November 15, 1944) is a professor of history at the University of California, Santa Barbara, and director of the Center for the Study of Work, Labor and Democracy.  He is labor historian who has written also about 20th-century American political economy, including the automotive industry and Wal-Mart.

Life and education
Lichtenstein received his bachelor's degree from Dartmouth College in 1966 and his Ph.D. in history from the University of California, Berkeley in 1974. He is MacArthur Foundation Chair in History at  UCSB.

Awards
Lichtenstein was named a junior fellow by the National Endowment for the Humanities (NEH) in 1982 and senior NEH fellow in 1993.  He received a Rockefeller Foundation Fellowship to undertake research at Wayne State University in 1990. He held a Guggenheim Fellowship in 1997-98. He was elected to membership in the Society of American Historians in 2007 and became MacArthur Foundation Professor of History at UC Santa Barbara in 2010.

Lichtenstein's book State of the Union: A Century of American Labor won the Philip Taft Labor History Book Award in 2003. The Sidney Hillman Foundation awarded him the Sol Stetin Prize in 2012

Books

Solely authored works
Walter Reuther, The Most Dangerous Man in Detroit.  Urbana, Ill.: University of Illinois Press, 1997.     Internet Archive link
Labor's War at Home: The CIO in World War II. Philadelphia: Temple University Press, 2003.    Google Books link
State of the Union: A Century of American Labor. New edition. Princeton, N.J.: Princeton University Press, 2003.   Google Books link
The Retail Revolution: How Wal-Mart Created a Brave New World of Business.New York: Henry Holt and Company, 2009.

Co-authored works
Who Built America? Vol. 2: 1865 to the Present, with Roy Rosenzweig and Joshua Brown. Boston: Bedford Books, 2007.

Edited works
Industrial Democracy in America, co-edited with Harris Howell John. Cambridge: Cambridge University Press, 1993.
Major Problems in the History of American Workers, with Eileen Boris.  Houghton Mifflin, 2002.
American Capitalism: Social Thought and Political Economy in the Twentieth Century. Philadelphia: University of Pennsylvania Press, 2006.    Google Books link
Wal-Mart: The Face of Twenty-First-Century Capitalism. New York: The New Press, 2005. Cloth ; Paperback 
The Right and Labor in America: Politics, Ideology, and Imagination, co-edited with Elizabeth Tandy Shermer. Philadelphia: University of Pennsylvania Press, 2012.

References

Further reading
Who's Who in the South and Southwest. 24th ed. New Providence, N.J.: Marquis Who's Who, 2002.

External links
Nelson Lichtenstein UCSB Faculty homepage
"Twenty Questions with Nelson Lichtenstein," In These Times
NPR interview with Lichtenstein on Wal-Mart, 2009
NPR interview with Lichtenstein about Taft-Hartley Act, 2002

20th-century American historians
American male non-fiction writers
Historians of the United States
Labor historians
Dartmouth College alumni
University of California, Berkeley alumni
1944 births
Living people
University of California, Santa Barbara faculty
People from Frederick, Maryland
21st-century American historians
21st-century American male writers
Historians from Maryland
20th-century American male writers